Solid Action is an album by the American jazz reedist Ken Vandermark, recorded in 1994 and released on Platypus. It was the second record by the Vandermark Quartet, which includes bassist Kent Kessler, drummer Michael Zerang and multi-instrumentalist Daniel Scanlan replacing former guitarist Todd Colburn.

Reception

In his review for AllMusic, Thom Jurek states: "Listening to this music now is breathtaking; it feels shamanic and brave and it engages the listener immediately with the force of both conviction and humor."

The Penguin Guide to Jazz claims that "Solid Action is Vandermark's first shot at greatness, with Scanlan a tremendously exciting figure on all of three of his instruments."

The DownBeat review by Bill Shoemaker states: "This band's second outing is a persuasive statement of Vandermark's ability to harness rock's gut-rending intensity to post-Coleman jazz's quest for liberating new structures."

Track listing
All compositions by Ken Vandermark except as indicated
 "Tasteless"  – 4:14
 "Catch 22" – 15:32
 "Le Saucisse de Fer" (Michael Zerang) – 6:40 
 "Bucket" – 14:36
 "Leadfoot"  – 5:30
 "For What It Is" (Todd Colburn) – 5:24
 "Let's Talk About Death" (Kent Kessler) – 9:16

Personnel
Ken Vandermark – tenor saxophone, clarinet, bass clarinet
Daniel Scanlan – violin, guitar, cornet
Kent Kessler – bass
Michael Zerang – drums

References

1994 albums
Ken Vandermark albums